Sugar High is the third studio album by Japanese singer-songwriter Chihiro Onitsuka, released in December 2002.

The album came out only nine months after its predecessor This Armor, and it comprises nine tracks that were previously unreleased as the singles. The album title was quoted from the lyrics of a song sung on the American motion picture Empire Records.

The first press of the album features bonus 8cm compact disc including another version of "Castle･Imitation" and its backing track.

Since Onitsuka cancelled the release of fourth studio album and left both the management office and record label in 2004, Sugar High became the final non-compilation album she released under the Virgin Tokyo label distributed by Toshiba EMI.

Track listing
All songs arranged and produced by Takefumi Haketa.

Personnel
Chihiro Onitsuka – Vocals
Takefumi Haketa – Acoustic piano, rhodes piano, wurlitzer, harpsichord
Takashi Nishiumi – Acoustic guitar, electric guitar
Hitoshi Watanabe –  Bass
Hitoshi Kusunoki – Drums
Toshiyuki Sugino – Drums
Ikuo Kakehashi – Percussion, conga, flame drum, tablas
Chieko Kinbara – Violin
Yoshihiko Eida – Violin
Haruko Yano – Violin
Joe Kuwata – Violin
Yukiko Iwato – Violin
Naoru Komiya – Violin
Nagisa Kiriyama – Violin
Norito Ohbayashi – Violin
Yukinori Murata – Violin
Osamu Iyoku – Violin
Motoko Fujiie – Violin
Hijiri Kuwano – Violin
Yuji Yamada – Viola
Sachie Ohnuma – Viola
Manami Tokutaka – Viola
Hirohito Furugawara – Viola
Masami Horisawa – Cello
Hiroyasu Yamamoto – Cello
Hiroki Kashiwagi – Cello
Haruki Matsuba – Cello
Yohei Matsuoka – Cello
Gaichi Ishibashi – Oboe

Certifications

Charts

Weekly charts

Year-end charts

Release history

Other Media
"Castle Imitation" was used as the end credits song in the video game Breath of Fire: Dragon Quarter

References

2002 albums
Chihiro Onitsuka albums